The VL Pyörremyrsky ("Hurricane") was a Finnish fighter, designed by DI Torsti Verkkola at the State Aircraft Factory (Valtion lentokonetehdas) for service with the Finnish Air Force in World War II. The war ended before the type's first flight and only a prototype was built.

History
On 26 November 1942 the Finnish Air Force ordered two Pyörremyrsky prototypes to be built. The aircraft were to be ready by May 1944. One prototype was later cancelled and only one aircraft was ever built. The aircraft designation VMT Pyörremyrsky is also sometimes used, as the factory had been formed into the State Metal Factories (Valtion Metallitehtaat) during the construction of the aircraft. The Finnish Air Force airplane code letters PM gave the plane nickname Puu-Mersu (Wooden Messerschmitt), but the plane was an independent design.

The use of wood in the construction of the aircraft was maximized due to the scarcity of metals. The goal was to create a fighter with similar flight qualities to the German Messerschmitt Bf 109G. The engine and the propeller were taken from the Bf 109G. The landing gear was significantly widened and installed on the wing instead of fuselage in order to address one of the German fighter's most noteworthy shortcomings. This significantly eased ground control, as well as take off and landing, while slightly impeding top speed as a consequence of the thickening of the wings to accommodate landing gear hydraulics.

The Pyörremyrsky prototype PM-1 made its first flight on 21 November 1945 at Härmälä, piloted by Esko Halme. After 25 minutes of flying, a piece from the cowling fell off and Halme had to land when fumes from the engine started to enter the cockpit. The pilot was saved by his oxygen mask. The aircraft was to fly only three test flights in Tampere, the third time being a transfer flight to Kuorevesi on 16 January 1946. There it flew an additional 31 test flights, the total flight time being 27 hours by 1947. The aircraft was flown by eight pilots: Esko Halme, Lauri Hämäläinen, Erkki Itävuori, Osmo Kauppinen, Lasse Heikinaro, Martti Laitinen, Heikki Keso and Lauri Lautamäki. The last flight lasted only 20 minutes and was made by captain Osmo Kauppinen on 22 July 1947.

The Pyörremyrsky design was considered quite successful. It could outclimb the Bf 109G-6 and it was very manoeuvrable. It was considered almost ready for mass production. Its only major problem with the design was found to be the low-quality glue used in the joints.

The aircraft was still in the prototype stage when the war ended and this also meant that the funds allocated for the project decreased. The Pyörremyrsky prototype was grounded after only some 30 hours of flying and the programme terminated as no funds were available for the purchase of new aircraft for the Finnish Air Force and sufficient Bf 109Gs remained in service to equip the fighter force that was permitted under the Armistice terms. The PM-1 was removed from FAF lists on 1 April 1953. The wing construction was later used in another Finnish aircraft, the all-metal Valmet Vihuri trainer.

Aircraft on display
The PM-1 prototype can today be seen at the Aviation Museum of Central Finland in Tikkakoski.

Specifications

See also

References
Notes

Bibliography

 Green, William. War Planes of the Second World War, Fighters, Volume One. London: Macdonald & Co.(Publishers) Ltd., 1960. .
 Swanborough, Gordon. Air Enthusiast, Volume One. London: Pilot Press, 1971. .

External links

 Pictures of the VL Pyörremyrsky:      

Pyorremyrsky
1940s Finnish fighter aircraft
Single-engined tractor aircraft
Low-wing aircraft
World War II aircraft of Finland
Aircraft first flown in 1945